Alfred Wallace Dunlop (12 January 1875 – 6 May 1933) was an Australian tennis player, born in Christchurch, New Zealand. He won the doubles title at the Australasian Championships, the future Australian Open, alongside Fred Alexander in 1908. He also reached the singles finals at the tournament that year, losing to Alexander. He represented Australasia in the Davis Cup several times between 1905 and 1914.

Grand Slam finals

Singles (1 runner-up)

Doubles (1 title)

References

External links

Australian male tennis players
New Zealand emigrants to Australia
Australasian Championships (tennis) champions
Sportspeople from Christchurch
1875 births
1933 deaths
Grand Slam (tennis) champions in men's doubles
19th-century Australian people
20th-century Australian people